Dion Lobb (born 3 December 1980) is a New Zealand former cricketer. He played one first-class match for Otago in 2007. Lobb retired from cricket at the end of the 2018–19 season, becoming a coach. He spent the majority of his career with the Green Island cricket team, playing in a record 415 matches for the side.

See also
 List of Otago representative cricketers

References

External links
 

1980 births
Living people
New Zealand cricketers
Otago cricketers
Cricketers from Dunedin